In New Zealand, 67% of the population play video games, 46% of video game players are female and the average age of a video game player is 34. New Zealanders spend an average of 88 minutes a day playing video games.

As of 31 March 2020, the New Zealand video game development industry employed 747 full-time game developers and New Zealand studios earned $323.9 million in revenue, of which 96% came from international audiences. In addition, New Zealand consumers spent $501.4m on video games in 2019. Despite the difference in population size, New Zealand game development is comparable to Australia's, in terms of revenue and employment.

Industry bodies for video games in New Zealand include the New Zealand Game Developers Association, which supports video game developers, and the Interactive Games and Entertainment Association, which represents publishers and platforms.

History

New Zealand was an early adopter of the video game phenomenon, despite its remoteness. Many Atari 2600 titles were assembled under licence by Monaco Distributors in Auckland. New Zealand developed its own Pong-style game console, the Sportronic, in the late 1970s, as a result of import licensing laws.
The development of games in New Zealand was continued in the 1980s and 90s. Notable games include Laser Hawk, which was developed for the Atari 8-bit in 1986 by Andrew Bradfield and Harvey Kong Tin, and Super Skidmarks, which was released for the Commodore Amiga in 1995 and was developed by Auckland-based company Acid Software.

Major companies and global recognition
Although a minor player in the global video gaming industry, New Zealand has had success with homegrown game developers. Sidhe, the largest game studio in New Zealand, have developed a number of sports games, including several titles in the Rugby League series. Dinosaur Polo Club developed Mini Metro. The action RPG Path of Exile, perhaps the best-known New Zealand game, was developed by Grinding Gear Games and released in 2013, enjoying international success. The video game series Bloons was made by the New Zealand company Ninja Kiwi. 

The New Zealand Game Developers Association was formed in 2001 to support the development of games in New Zealand.

Events and exhibitions
The New Zealand Game Developers Conference is held annually. The New Zealand Games Festival is held in Wellington around Easter each year and includes several events including the Play By Play conference and The Pavs, the New Zealand Games Awards. There are many regular Meetups in cities nationwide.

The Game Masters exhibition was held at the Museum of New Zealand Te Papa Tongarewa from 15 December 2012 through to 28 April 2013. The Arcade:Homegrown Video Games exhibition was held at Dowse Art Museum from 10 Nov 2012 – 24 Feb 2013 and then toured nationally.

Independent scene
The rise of digital platforms has seen independent studios publish video games worldwide, including Rainbite and Screenshock Games, each consisting of developers trained at Media Design School in Auckland.

Controversies
In 2003, Manhunt became the first video game officially banned in New Zealand.

Video Game Development

Game developers from New Zealand

 A44 Games
 Balancing Monkey Games
 Black Salt Games
 Camshaft Software LTD
 Code Force Limited
 Cosmink
 Hyporeal Ltd
 Metia Interactive
 Morepork Games
 Mune Studio
 Ninja Kiwi
 RageQuit Studios (Not the same as Polish dev Rage Quit Games)
 Rainbite
 retna studios
 RiffRaff Games (Prior name 'Studio Mayday' 2019 till 2022)
 Shoggoth Games
 StaplesVR (AR/VR experiences, training & games; apps)
 Trigger Happy Interactive
 Weathership Ltd
 Wētā Workshop (Game studio)

Misc Games

 2UP Games (Mobile games. Investment from Supercell.)
 Beyond Studio (VR & mobile games)
 CerebralFix Limited (Mobile, online & VR/AR games; apps; art co-production)
 GEO AR Games (AR games)
 Grinding Gear Games (Online games)
 Mad Carnival Games (Founded by co-founder of Method Studios & M-Theory. Online games.)
 Media Design School (Educational institution with game developments)
 Method Studios (Interactive entertainment, AR/VR, motion control games)
 Mighty Eyes (Merger of M-Theory & Oddboy. AR/VR games.)
 M-Theory (AR/VR, games, apps. Setup by founders of Method Studios.)
 Oddboy (AR/VR games & experiences)
 RUSH Digital Interactive (Interactive experiences, imagery, AI, UI design, apps. No games.)
 Swibo Ltd (Fitness technology)

Co-Development Services

 InGame (Interactive training, edutainment, VR sims, film & TV transmedia, gamification)
 Second Intention (Code polish, art production)

Defunct video game companies of New Zealand

 AlphaSim (Founded 1999. Defunct 2010. Sim addons dev.)
 Starcolt Studios Ltd (Founded 2018. Probably defunct in 2022.)
 Stickmen Studios (Founded 2006. Absorbed into CerebralFix Limited in 2016. Online games.)
 Straylight Studios (Founded 2004. Defunct 2009. Edutainment.)

Video game publishers of New Zealand

 JaffaJam (Mobile games)
 MYTONA (Singaporean. NZ office.)
 Prodigy Design Limited (Holding group)
 PikPok / Sidhe Interactive
 Synty Studios (Art assets publisher)

Publisher & developer firms

 Astronaut Diaries Limited
 Atawhai Interactive
 Bardsley Creative
 Cloak and Dagger Games (Based in UK. Remote work.)
 Delphinium Games
 Deep Field Games
 Digital Confectioners (Online games)
 Dinosaur Polo Club
 Dry Cactus Games
 ENDESGA
 Esenthel (Open-source engine creation)
 Flightless Studios
 Gaugepunk Games (VR & sim games)
 Hashbane Interactive
 Irreflex Studios
 It’s Anecdotal
 Kreg (Online games)
 Mainframe Games (Not the same as Nordic dev 'Mainframe Industries')
 Majic Jungle
 Many Worlds Limited (AR/VR, MR, app, web & games development. Also co-devs.)
 Mental Drink Ltd
 Outerdawn (Prior name 'Artrix' in 2014 till 2020)
 Phat Loot Studios (Online games)
 Rexoto Games
 Rocketwerkz
 Runaway Play (Mobile games)
 Sky Bear Games
 Space Crab Labs
 Spotted Kiwi Interactive (Online games)
 Thousand Tonic
 Undermog Games
 Usual Suspects Studios
 Wicked Art Studios
 Wildboy Studios

References

External links
 New Zealand Game Developers Association
 More than a Craze: Photographs of New Zealand's early digital games scene
 Early Games Production in New Zealand, Melanie Swalwell, 2005
 WellPlayed's tag list (For New Zealand-made games. WellPlayed is an Australian gaming media outlet with a focus on AU/NZ games.)
 New Zealand Centre of Digital Excellence (CODE) news page (Regular updates of new game developers & funding are available here)